Huddersfield Town's 1947–48 campaign was a dreadful season for Town under new manager George Stephenson, brother of Town legend Clem Stephenson. They would finish the season in 19th place in Division 1, but had to endure the humiliation of being knocked out of the FA Cup by Southern League side Colchester United.

Squad at the start of the season

Review
Following David Steele's resignation, George Stephenson, brother of Town legend Clem was appointed as the new manager at Leeds Road. The previous season's 20th-place finish needed to improve and Town made a bright start with 3 wins in the first 6 games, including a 5–1 win at Grimsby Town. A 5–1 win at Bolton Wanderers, the following month stopped a winless run of 6 matches, but Town only won 12 matches in the league all season and never won more than 2 matches in a row.

The main lowlight of a dreadful season, however, came in the FA Cup, when Town lost 1–0 to Southern League side Colchester United. It is still renowned as one of the most high-profile giant-killings in FA Cup history.

Squad at the end of the season

Results

Division One

FA Cup

Appearances and goals

1947-48
English football clubs 1947–48 season